Alakol Lake (from Turkic "motley lake") is a lake located in the Balkhash-Alakol Basin, part of the Almaty and Shyghyz regions, east central Kazakhstan.

The lake is the northwest extension of the region known as the Dzhungarian Gate (Alataw Pass), a narrow valley connects the southern uplands of Kazakhstan with arid northwest China. Two well-defined alluvial fans are visible where mountain streams cut through the faulted landscape to the southwest of the lake.

Its waters are reputed to have medicinal properties since the time of the silk road. In 2021, Lake Alakol was selected as one of the top 10 tourist destinations in Kazakhstan.

Geography
A swampy lowland (just above the center of the photo) connects the northwest end of Lake Alakol with the Kosharkol and
Sasykkol (the two lighter-colored lakes in the photo). From the southern tip of Lake Alakol a narrow swampy valley connects it to the freshwater Lake Zhalanashkol (at the bottom edge of the picture).

Among them are the southerly draining Urzhar River at the north end of the lake, and the Emil River, on the lake's north-eastern shore. During seasonal floods, surplus water drains from Lake Zhalanashkol to
Lake Alakol along the 10-km long slough called Zhaman-Otkel.

The Alakol State Sanctuary has been created to protect the area for the lake is an important breeding and nesting ground for various wetland birds, notably the very rare relict gull. Piski Island has flocks of flamingo, and 40 species of other birds. UNESCO designated the Alakol Biosphere Reserve as part of its Man and the Biosphere Programme in 2013.

The largest island in Alakol Lake is Ul'kun-Aral-Tyube. It is located in the center of the lake.

Agricultural activity in this arid region is limited to areas where adequate moisture is available, mainly along ephemeral streambeds and in the deltas and alluvial fans.

The Bronze Age Alakul culture is situated in the general region of the lake. In the middle of the 1st century BCE the Lake Alakol marked an eastern end of the Kangju state, shown on Chinese maps of the Western territory.

History 
During the reign of Timur, it was said that this lake "It-Ichmes" (translated "dog will not drink") because one liter of water contains 8 g of salt. Kimaks (IX-XI centuries) called this lake Gagan, after the city located on the site of the village of Koktuma. The great gift of nature in Kazakhstan-Alakol.

The lake is already thought to be reported in the account given by William of Rubruck of his voyage to Karakorum, but he thinks it to be an inner sea, the oriental end of the Lake Balkash."

Medical property 
Modern medical research confirms the healing qualities of lake water. Sea breath of Alakol in a combination with dry, hot, filled with aroma of steppes, the air has a beneficial effect on humans. It was in the resort areas of Alakol that cosmonauts underwent rehabilitation after returning from orbit.

See also
 Emin Valley

References

External links
Data summary: Alakol
National Aeronautics and Space Administration
Lake Alakol birds

Alakol
Landforms of Almaty Region
East Kazakhstan Region
Balkhash-Alakol Basin